Tom Coventry (1856 – 1 December 1932) was a British actor.

Coventry was born in Finsbury, in Central London and died, aged 76, in Ealing, London.

Selected filmography
 Five Nights (1915)
 The New Clown (1916)
 A Fortune at Stake (1918)
 Convict 99 (1919) - Hewett
 Class and No Class (1921)
 The Double Event (1921)
 Mary Find the Gold (1921)
 The House of Peril (1922)
 A Sporting Double (1922)
 A Gipsy Cavalier (1922)
 Sam's Boy (1922)
 The Sporting Instinct (1922)
 The Monkey's Paw (1923)
 Paddy the Next Best Thing (1923)
 Dixon's Return (1924)
 Claude Duval (1924)
 The Wonderful Wooing (1925)
 The Squire of Long Hadley (1925)
 Nell Gwyn (1926)
 Second to None (1927)
 The Guns of Loos (1928)
 Under the Greenwood Tree (1929)

References

External links

1863 births
1932 deaths
English male film actors
English male silent film actors
20th-century English male actors
Male actors from London